Jack Boyd (24 February 1906 – 26 April 1996) was an Australian rules footballer who played with Essendon in the Victorian Football League (VFL).

Notes

External links 

1906 births
1996 deaths
Australian rules footballers from Victoria (Australia)
Essendon Football Club players
Ballarat Football Club players